Češnjice pri Moravčah is a settlement in the Municipality of Moravče in central Slovenia. The area is part of the traditional region of Upper Carniola. It is now included with the rest of the municipality in the Central Slovenia Statistical Region.

Name
Češnjice pri Moravčah was attested in historical sources as Chersteten in 1367, Nider Kerstet in 1431, Ober Cherstetten in 1436, and Kerssteten in 1444, among other names. The name of the settlement was changed from Češnjice to Češnjice pri Moravčah in 1953. In the past the German name was Kerschdorf.

Cultural heritage
A 16th-century mansion, built on a small hill in the southeastern part of the settlement, was burned by the Partisans in 1943.

References

External links
 
Češnjice pri Moravčah on Geopedia

Populated places in the Municipality of Moravče